Dragiša Krstović (born 11 February 1947) is a Kosovo Serb politician. He was a prominent community figure in the early years of the United Nations Interim Administration Mission in Kosovo (UNMIK) mandate and was at one time the leader of the Serbian "Return" alliance in the Assembly of Kosovo.

Early life and career
Krstović was born in the village of Dren in the municipality of Leposavić, in what was then the Autonomous Region of Kosovo and Metohija in the People's Republic of Serbia, Federal People's Republic of Yugoslavia. He graduated in law and was a municipal court justice for several years.

Politician
Krstović was elected to the Assembly of Kosovo as a candidate of the Serb community's "Return" coalition in the 2001 Kosovan parliamentary election, which was held under the auspices of UNMIK. The coalition received twenty-two mandates in the 120-member chamber, which was dominated by parties from the province's majority Albanian community. Relations between the Albanian and Serb communities were generally poor in the aftermath of the Kosovo War (1998–99), and the Serb bloc in the assembly often boycotted its proceedings to protest the status of its community, the inability of Serb refugees to return to their homes, and the marginalization of Serb assembly members.

Leader of the "Return" coalition
In December 2002, Krstović was chosen as the leader of the Return parliamentary group, replacing Rada Trajković. Shortly after his appointment, he endorsed Nebojša Čović's call for a new Dayton conference on the status of Kosovo. Krstović was quoted as saying, "The Albanians have a firm position on independence for Kosmet [Kosovo and Metohija] and the Serbs maintain that the province should remain a part of Serbia and Yugoslavia. Other variants also exist and I believe that it is possible to reach a solution that will satisfy both sides." He welcomed subsequent diplomatic talks in Vienna, although he criticized the absence of Kosovo Serb representatives from Priština's delegation.

Krstović was often critical of Michael Steiner, who led UNMIK in 2002–03. In March 2003, he and other Serb leaders complained that they were dissatisfied with the UN body's track record in providing security and freedom of movement for the Serb community. The following month, he warned that Steiner's decision to transfer various responsibilities from UNMIK to the interim Kosovo institutions was premature and could lead to regional destabilization. He welcomed Steiner's departure in June 2003, saying that the outgoing UNMIK leader had not "done a thing for the return of the non-Albanian population."

In December 2003, Krstović led a walkout of Serb delegates after the Kosovo assembly approved a declaration against recognition of the upcoming Serbian parliamentary election on the territory of Kosovo. (UNMIK subsequently rejected the assembly's resolution and confirmed that Kosovo residents would be allowed to participate in the vote).

Krstović made efforts to stop the 2004 unrest in Kosovo, the worst outbreak of inter-communal violence in the province after the Kosovo War. During the peak of the violence, he told a reporter, "I made appeals to the Serbs to refrain from escalating clashes because the shedding of blood is in nobody's interests." He later agreed to meet with Kosovo prime minister Bajram Rexhepi to discuss solutions for ending the violence.

In July 2004, Krstović reached an agreement with Rexhepi and Kosovo president Ibrahim Rugova to request that UNMIK create a new ministry to deal with the return of displaced persons to Kosovo. This was described in media reports as a rare point of co-operation between representatives of the Albanian and Serb communities.

Krstović was the chair of the committee on communities and a member of the judicial affairs committee during his first term in the assembly.

Second term in the Kosovo assembly
Notwithstanding calls for a boycott, Krstović and some other leaders of the Kosovo Serb community chose to participate in the 2004 Kosovan parliamentary election on the Serbian List for Kosovo and Metohija (not to be confused with the later Serb List). The turnout in the Serb community was very low, with only around fifteen hundred out of two hundred thousand eligible voters casting a ballot. Because ten seats in the assembly are automatically reserved for Serb delegates, the Serbian List still won eight mandates, one of which went to Krstović. He considered not taking his seat due to the boycott, but he ultimately had his mandate verified on 3 December. Krstović later blamed the boycott for worsening political conditions in the province, saying that Serb voters could have improved their standing by electing at least thirty deputies through a strong turnout. He did not continue as leader of the Serb bloc in the new assembly; this role was taken by Oliver Ivanović.

During his second term in the assembly, Krstović was a member of the committee on justice, legislation, and the constitutional framework.

Krstović was a member of the Democratic Party (Demokratska stranka, DS) for most of his time as an elected official. He was dismissed as the party's municipal leader in Leposavić in 2005 and subsequently became an independent.

Since 2007
Krstović was not a candidate in the 2007 Kosovan parliamentary election, which was again largely boycotted by the Serb community.

He sought election as mayor of Leposavić in the 2013 local elections as a candidate of the Independent Liberal Party and finished in third place. He also appeared on the party's electoral list in the concurrent municipal assembly election, which was held under open list proportional representation. He finished in fourth place among the party's candidates and, as the list won only two mandates, was not elected.

Electoral record

Notes

References

1947 births
Living people
Kosovo Serbs
People from Leposavić
Members of the Assembly of Kosovo (UNMIK mandate until 2008)
Democratic Party (Serbia) politicians
Independent Liberal Party (Kosovo) politicians